Glenorchy is a rural locality in the Fraser Coast Region, Queensland, Australia.

Geography 
The Bruce Highway passes through the locality from north (Tinana South) to south (Owanyilla).

The locality's south-western boundary is the Mary River. A number of small creeks have their source in the locality; all of which are tributaries directly or indirectly of the Mary River.

The principal land use is irrigated cropping, principally sugarcane. There is also grazing on native vegetation.

Education 
There are no schools in Glenorchy. The nearest primary school is in Tinana South and the nearest secondary schools are in Maryborough.

References 

Fraser Coast Region
Localities in Queensland